The 1998 Speedway Grand Prix of Great Britain was the fourth race of the 1998 Speedway Grand Prix season. It took place on 7 August in the Brandon Stadium in Coventry, England It was the fourth British SGP and first in Coventry. SGP was won by Australian rider Jason Crump. It was the second win of his career, after winning in 1996 London GP.

Starting positions draw 

The Speedway Grand Prix Commission nominated Antonín Kasper, Jr. (Czech Republic) and Joe Screen and Martin Dugard (both from Great Britain) as Wild Card.

Heat details

The intermediate classification

See also 
 Speedway Grand Prix
 List of Speedway Grand Prix riders

References

External links 
 FIM-live.com
 SpeedwayWorld.tv

Gr
Speedway Grand Prix
1998
Speedway Grand Prix of Great Britain
Speedway Grand Prix of Great Britain